The 2013 Emakumeen Euskal Bira will be the 26th edition of the Emakumeen Bira, a women's cycling stage race in Spain. It was rated by the UCI as category 2.1, and was held between 6 and 9 June 2013.

Stages

Stage 1
6 June 2013 – Iurreta to Iurreta, 
The first stage ended with a bunch sprint.

Stage 2
7 June 2013 – Aretxabaleta to Aretxabaleta,

Stage 3
8 June 2013 – Orduña to Orduña (individual time trial),

Stage 4
9 June 2013 – Fruiz to Gatika,

Classification progress

See also
 2013 in women's road cycling

References

External links

Emakumeen Euskal Bira
Emakumeen Euskal Bira
Emakumeen Euskal Bira